Safa Kabir (born 29 August 1991)  is a Bangladeshi model and actress and former RJ. She is notable for her works in TV commercials and drama / telefilm since 2013.

Early life
Safa Kabir was born in Barisal, Bangladesh. She is an alumna of BAF Shaheen College, Dhaka. As of 2017, she was studying BBA in American International University-Bangladesh.

Career
She has made her début in media world when she has worked in a TVC of Airtel Bangladesh. Then she has worked in the TVCs of Pran Peanut Bar and Parachute Coconut Oil. After that she has acted in multiple telefilms. safa Kabir kicks off the journey in the media industry with a television commercial for Airtel Bangladesh directed by Ashfaq Bipul. She performs in several popular TVCs including ‘Pran Peanut Bar’ and ‘Parachute Oil’. Safa hosted a program ‘Style and Trend’ on NTV.

TV dramas and telefilms (selection)

 Chorer Master
 Miss Shiuly
 Apni Ki Hotashay Bhugchen?
 Trap
 Veg Nonveg
 Password
 A Bitter Love Story
 Victim
 Dhakaiya Ashik"
 Dhakaiya Wedding"
 Dhakaiya Khandan"
 Eta Mitthe Kono Golpo Noi"
 Last Good-bye"
 Saat Sotero"
 Mission Barisal"
 Newly Married
 Shudhu Tomar Jonno
 Take Care
 Recent Prem
 Tumi Bolle
 Prothom Valobasha
 Baby Rasel
 Oh! My Darling
 Last Rain
 Heartless
 Good Boy Bad Girl
 Fighter
 FRIED RICE
 Valobashi Toke
 Gift Girl
 Perfect One
 Baghbondi
 Bibaho Dot Com
 Show Maker
 Makeup Girl
 Cha Patha
 Kagojer Plan
 Kuheli
 Fapor
 Shironam Nei
 After Break
 My Friend's Girl
 Abeg Kumar
 Vul Manush
 Eka Meye
 Gaye Holud
 Fahim The Great Fajil
 Meyetar Cheleta
 Millionaire From Barisal
 @18 All Time Dourer Upor
 First Year Damn Care
 A Driver
 Atopor Amra
 Bhai Kichu Bolte Chay
 Chakka
 Ei Golper Nam Nei
 Miss Match
 Obosheshe Amra
 Potaka
 Soulmate
 Tobuo Bhalobasi
 Tomake Astei Hobe
 Tomar Apon Hater Dole
 Tomar Jonno'''
 Tonima Tumi Bolle Valobasa 101GhranushDim VajiMeghla Meghla DinRajkumariTumi Valo Theko Fagun Theke FaguneBithir Banan Vul ChiloShort films

 Deyal Bandhobi 
 Kanamachi OkkhorMusic videos

 Amar Kache Tumi Onnorokom (Singer : Imran Mahmudul)
 Emon Ekta Tumi Chai (Singer: Imran Mahmudul)
  Mitthe Golpobaz  (Singer: Setu Chowdhury)
 Khoka (Singer : Ferdous Wahid)

 Jabe ki chole (Singer: Topu & Anila)
 Emon Keno Korcho (Singer: Milon)
 Kotha Dilam (Singer: Ehsan Rahi)
 Tomake Chuye Dibo (Singer: Imran & Kona)
 Shortohin Valobasha (Singer: Milon)
 Daiko Na Bhaiya (Singer: Syed Nafis & Shubro Raha)
 Shopnogulo Pahara (Singer: Nahiyan)
 Bojhe Na Bou - OST (Singer: G.M. Ashraf & Subhro Raha)
 Horsho (Singer: Sabbir Nasir)

Radio program
 Love Struck By Safa Kabir (ABC Radio)

Host
 Teer Little Chef One Question Go''

TV advertisement
 Fair & Lovely
 Robi (company)
 Airtel Bangladesh
 Bellisimo
 Goldmark's Pops Biscuit
 Mr. Noodles
 Pran Peanut Bar
 Sunsilk
 WE Mobile

Web series

References

External links

1994 births
Bangladeshi female models
Bangladeshi television actresses
Living people
Bangladeshi radio personalities
American International University-Bangladesh alumni